Zinc finger protein 134 is a protein that in humans is encoded by the ZNF134 gene.

References

Further reading 

Human proteins